Sudogda is a town and the administrative center of Sudogodsky District in Vladimir Oblast, Russia, located on the left bank of the river Sudogda (Klyazma's tributary)  southeast of Vladimir, the administrative center of the oblast. Population:

History
First mentioned in the 17th century documents as the sloboda of Sudogodskaya, it was later known as the selo of Sudogda. Town status was granted to it in 1778.

Administrative and municipal status
Within the framework of administrative divisions, Sudogda serves as the administrative center of Sudogodsky District, to which it is directly subordinated. As a municipal division, the town of Sudogda is incorporated within Sudogodsky Municipal District as Sudogda Urban Settlement.

References

Notes

Sources

Cities and towns in Vladimir Oblast
Sudogodsky Uyezd